Halil Akıncı (born 9 December 1945) is a retired Turkish diplomat who served as the Turkish Ambassador to Slovenia, India, and Russia. He was formerly the Secretary General of the Turkic Council. On the photo Ambassador Akinci presents his credentials to Russian President Dmitry Medvedev on 18 September 2008.

References

Living people
Ambassadors of Turkey to Russia
1945 births
Secretaries-General of the Turkic Council